SS Orsova may refer to:

 , an ocean liner operated by the Orient Steam Navigation Company 1909–1936.
 , an ocean liner operated by the Orient Steam Navigation Company 1954–1966.

Ship names